Turkey participated in the Eurovision Song Contest 2009 with the song "Düm Tek Tek" written by Sinan Akçıl, Stefan Fernande and Hadise. The song was performed by Hadise. The entry was selected through an internal selection organised by Turkish broadcaster Türkiye Radyo ve Televizyon Kurumu (TRT).

Before Eurovision

Internal selection 
On 18 September 2008, TRT opened the suggestions for the public to nominate potential artists for consideration. In October 2008, TRT announced that two artists were shortlisted following public input: Hadise and Şebnem Ferah. Hadise was considered due to her being a likeable artist that would appeal to the European countries, while Ferah was considered as her rock music would be better for the contest. On 21 October 2008, TRT announced that Belgian-Turkish singer Hadise had been internally selected to represent Turkey in Moscow. It was also announced that she would have total control of the song she would perform at the contest, including the lyricist, composer, arranger and language of the song. The singer later stated that she would be personally working on the lyrics as well as possibly collaborating with songwriters in Belgium. Three songs were submitted by Hadise to the broadcaster in December 2008 and a selection committee selected "Düm Tek Tek" as the song she would perform at the contest. 

On 1 January 2009, "Düm Tek Tek" was presented to the public during the TRT New Year's Eve television special. As such, Turkey was one of the first countries to have had its artist and song selected for the 2009 Eurovision Song Contest, and only the second to do so before the end of 2008. The song was written by Sinan Akçıl, Stefan Fernande, as well as Hadise herself.

At Eurovision 
Turkey competed in one of the two semi-finals after Mor ve Ötesi came 7th in the 2008 contest. In the semi-final 1 she performed 9th, following Switzerland and preceding Israel. Turkey was ranked second, with 172 points and qualifying for the final. In the final, Turkey performed 18th, following Germany and preceding Albania, and ended 4th with 177 points.

Voting

Points awarded to Turkey

Points awarded by Turkey

Detailed voting results

References 

2009
Countries in the Eurovision Song Contest 2009
Eurovision